"Coming Home" is a song co-written and performed by American rhythm and blues singer Leon Bridges, issued as the first single from his debut studio album of the same name. The song peaked at number seven on the Billboard Triple A chart in 2015. In 2022 the song was featured in a McDonald's advert.

Live performances
Bridges performed "Coming Home" on The Tonight Show Starring Jimmy Fallon on June 22, 2015. On August 5, he performed the song on Conan.

Music video

The official music video for the song was directed by Chip Tompkins. The music video was released on March 3, 2015, and as of August 2022, has over 32 million views.

Charts

Weekly charts

Year-end charts

Certifications

References

External links
 
 

2015 debut singles
2015 songs
Leon Bridges songs
Columbia Records singles
Songs written by Leon Bridges